KMAS may refer to:

 KMAS (AM), a radio station (1030 AM) licensed to serve Shelton, Washington, United States
 KMAS-LD, a defunct low-power television station (channel 33) formerly licensed to serve Denver, Colorado, United States
 Korean Music Awards, a South Korean music awards show